Don Daredevil Rides Again (1951) is a Republic Movie serial.  It makes heavy use of stock footage from Republic's previous Zorro serials.  The character of Don Daredevil (Ken Curtis) was created for this serial as the rights to Zorro belonged to Disney by 1951.

Plot
A vile political boss named Stratton (Roy Barcroft) hires a gang of night riders to scare off the local landowners so he can claim their lands for himself. Patricia Doyle (Aline Towne) fights back to keep her property from being stolen from her, with the aid of her cousin Lee Hadley (Ken Curtis) and her neighbor Gary Taylor. Lee realizes that help is not forthcoming from the government, so he disguises himself as a masked Zorro-like figure called Don Daredevil, and battles the land grabbers in much the same way his grandfather used to do many years ago, as the original Don Daredevil. Lee decimates the gang over the course of the 12 episodes, and finally fights Stratton one-on-one inside a burning farmhouse in the finale of the film.

Cast
 Ken Curtis as Lee Hadley, otherwise known as "Don Daredevil"
 Aline Towne as Patricia Doyle
 Roy Barcroft as Douglas Stratton
 Lane Bradford as Webber
 Robert Einer as Gary Taylor
 John Cason as Hagen
 I. Stanford Jolley as the sheriff
 Guy Teague
 Tom Steele
 Sandy Sanders
 Michael Ragan
 Cactus Mack
 Lee Phelps
 Hank Patterson

Production
Don Daredevil Rides Again was budgeted at $153,080 although the final negative cost was $155,200 (a $2,120, or 1.4%, overspend).  It was the most expensive Republic serial of 1951.

It was filmed between 5 February and 27 February 1951.  The serial's production number was 1930.

Don Daredevil Rides Again used stock footage taken from the earlier serial Zorro's Black Whip.

Stunts
Tom Steele as Lee Hadley/Don Daredevil/Henchman Black (doubling Ken Curtis)
Eddie Parker as Douglas Stratton (doubling Roy Barcroft)
Dale Van Sickel as Gary Taylor/Dan Farley (doubling Robert Einer)
Carey Loftin as Hagen/Henchman Owens  (doubling John Cason)

Special effects
Special effects by the Lydecker brothers

Release

Theatrical
Don Daredevil Rides Again'''s official release date is 11 April 1951, although this is actually the date the sixth chapter was made available to film exchanges.

Critical reception
Cline describes this serial as just a "quickie."

Chapter titles
 Return of the Don (20min)
 Double Death (13min 20s)
 Hidden Danger (13min 20s)
 Retreat to Destruction (13min 20s)
 Cold Steel (13min 20s)
 The Flaming Juggernaut (13min 20s)
 Claim Jumper (13min 20s)
 Perilous Combat (13min 20s)
 Hostage of Destiny (13min 20s)
 Marked for Murder (13min 20s) - a re-cap chapter
 The Captive Witness (13min 20s)
 Flames of Vengeance (13min 20s)
Source:

See also
 List of film serials by year
 List of film serials by studio
The Republic Zorro serials:Zorro Rides Again (1937)Zorro's Fighting Legion (1939)Zorro's Black Whip (1944)Ghost of Zorro'' (1949)

References

External links

1951 films
American black-and-white films
1950s English-language films
Republic Pictures film serials
Films directed by Fred C. Brannon
1951 adventure films
American adventure films
1950s American films